The men's pole vault event at the 2007 Summer Universiade was held on 12 August.

Results

References
Results
Final results

Pole
2007